A sofa is a piece of furniture, also called a couch.

Sofa or SOFA may refer to:

People
 Sofa (warrior), slave-soldiers in the Mali Empire and its successor states
Ahmed Sofa (1943–2001), a Bangladeshi writer
Sofa Landver (born 1949), Israeli politician

Places
 SoFA District, an area of San Jose, California, US

Music 
 Sofa (Canadian band), a Montreal-based band that was active from 1993 to 1997
 "Sofa" (Frank Zappa song), a composition by American musician, Frank Zappa from the 1975 album One Size Fits All
 "Sofa Song" (song), 2005 single by The Kooks off the album Inside In/Inside Out
 Sofa Sound, recording studio founded by Peter Hammill

Software 
 Standards of Fundamental Astronomy, an astronomical software library
 SOFA (component system), an open source framework for designing and implementing component-based applications
 Spatially Oriented Format for Acoustics, a file format for storing spatially oriented acoustic data like head-related transfer functions
 Simulation Open Framework Architecture, an open-source framework primarily targeted at real-time physical simulation
 SOFA Statistics, an open-source statistical package

Other uses
 The Sofa: A Moral Tale , a 1742 libertine novel by Claude Prosper Jolyot de Crébillon
 SOFA score, used to track a patient's status during the stay in an intensive care unit
 Sequential Organ Failure Assessment, see organ dysfunction
 Status of forces agreement, an agreement between a country and a foreign nation stationing military forces in that country
 Statement of Financial Affairs, a form attached to a debtor's petition for bankruptcy in the United States

See also

 sofa.com, online UK furniture store
 SofaStore.com, online UK furniture store, brick-and-mortar store as Oak Furniture Land
 "The New Sofa" (episode), an episode of the UK sitcom The Royle Family
 Moving sofa problem
 Behind the sofa
 Couch (disambiguation)
 Settee (disambiguation)
 Sofa King (disambiguation)
 
 Sofia (disambiguation)